Myxiops aphos is a species of characin endemic to Brazil, where it is found in the Rio Lençois in Bahia.  It is the only member of its genus.

References
 

Characidae
Monotypic fish genera
Fish of South America
Fish of Brazil
Endemic fauna of Brazil
Fish described in 2004